Glen Village is a settlement in the Falkirk council area of Scotland, situated at the southern end of Callendar Park, and around  south of Falkirk town centre. It adjoins the housing estate of Hallglen, with the two localities counted together in most official statistics.

Description
These homes replaced an older community of outdated miners rows from the latter part of the 19th century, and the mines themselves closed by the 1960s. Falkirk was originally isolated, but nowadays it adjoins the larger housing estate of Hallglen, which was constructed in the early 1970s on an incline between the Callendar Park wooded estate and the railway. Hallglen is where most local amenities are situated (except the local primary school which is on the Glen Village side of the main road, being connected to the majority of local housing by a pedestrian footbridge). The village formerly held a community hall, post office and a bowling club, but all have now closed. Both the Glen and Hallglen names appear on the Timothy Pont's Blaeu map of the area surveyed in the 1590s.

To the west, the building of the Lionthorn private housing development in the early 21st century, which in turn adjoins the older Lochgreen neighbourhood, has created a near-continuous suburban chain between Glen Village and the southern part of Falkirk proper around Falkirk High Station, also with a population of around 3,000.

Adjacent to the village is the Union Canal where there is the  Falkirk Tunnel which was completed in 1821, it is known locally as the "Dark Tunnel". Both were constructed as William Forbes Sr and Jr, the powerful successive owners of nearby Callendar House, did not want the canal or the railway to spoil their views of the landscape. In the 2001 UK census, Glen Village and Hallglen were recorded as having a combined population of 3,488 residents.

Sport
Many local amateur football clubs have come from the area, including the Hallglen Hoofters and the former Chequers team who played their home matches at Glen Park.

See also
List of places in Falkirk council area

References

External links

Scottish Brick History - Callendar
Canmore - Union Canal, Bridge No. 60 site record
Canmore - Union Canal, Bridge No. 61 site record
 Falkirk Tunnel at Railscot 

Villages in Falkirk (council area)